Julian Lawrence Gargiulo (born  November 10, 1972) is an Italian-American classical pianist known for his interactive, humorous performances of classical music.

Biography
Gargiulo was born in Naples, Italy. He studied at the Verona State Conservatory with Aureliana Randone, the Mugi Academy in Rome with Aldo Ciccolini, and the Moscow Conservatory with Mikhail Mezhlumov.  In 1995 he moved to the United States, where he studied at Rowan University with Veda Zuponcic, at the Peabody Institute of the Johns Hopkins University with Boris Slutsky (MM), and at the University of Maryland with Santiago Rodriguez (DMA).

Dr. Gargiulo is artistic director of the Water Island Music Festival and of Getting to Carnegie, an annual competition which rotates between violin, cello and voice, and in which the audience decides the winner.

Compositions

External links
 Official website

References

1972 births
21st-century American male musicians
21st-century American pianists
21st-century classical pianists
American classical pianists
American male classical pianists
Italian classical musicians
Italian classical pianists
Italian male pianists
Living people